The 2021 Maia Challenger II was a professional tennis tournament played on clay courts. It was the fourth edition of the tournament which was part of the 2021 ATP Challenger Tour. It took place in Maia, Portugal from 13 to 19 December 2021.

Singles main-draw entrants

Seeds

 1 Rankings are as of 6 December 2021.

Other entrants
The following players received wildcards into the singles main draw:
  Pedro Araújo
  Tiago Cação
  Fábio Coelho

The following player received entry into the singles main draw as a special exempt:
  Oleg Prihodko

The following players received entry into the singles main draw as alternates:
  Elliot Benchetrit
  Oleksii Krutykh
  Oriol Roca Batalla

The following players received entry from the qualifying draw:
  Elmar Ejupovic
  Edoardo Lavagno
  Luca Potenza
  Damien Wenger

Champions

Singles

  Tseng Chun-hsin def.  Nuno Borges 5–7, 7–5, 6–2.

Doubles

  Nuno Borges /  Francisco Cabral def.  Piotr Matuszewski /  David Pichler 6–4, 7–5.

References

2021 ATP Challenger Tour
2021 in Portuguese tennis
December 2021 sports events in Portugal